Alfred Loomis may refer to:
 Alfred Lee Loomis (1887–1975), American physicist and philanthropist
 Alfred Lebbeus Loomis (1831–1895), American physician
 Alfred Loomis (sailor) (1913–1994), American investment banker and Olympic sailor